The European Golden Shoe, also known as European Golden Boot, is an award that is presented each season to the leading goalscorer in league matches from the top division of a European national league. The trophy is a sculpture of a football boot. From its inception in the 1967–68 season, the award, originally called "Soulier d'Or", which translates from French as Golden Shoe or Boot, has been given to the top goalscorer in all European leagues during a season. Since 1997, it has been calculated using a weighting in favour of the highest ranked leagues. Originally presented by L'Équipe magazine, it has been awarded by the European Sports Media since the 1996–97 season. Lionel Messi has won the award six times, the most out of every winner, all while playing for Barcelona.

History
Between 1968 and 1991, the award was given to the highest goalscorer in any European league. This was regardless of the strength of the league in which the top scorer played and the number of games in which the player had taken part. During this period Eusébio, Gerd Müller, Dudu Georgescu and Fernando Gomes each won the Golden Shoe twice.

Following a protest from the Cyprus FA, which claimed that a Cypriot player with 40 goals should have received the award (though the official top scorers for the season are both listed with 19 goals), L'Équipe issued no awards between 1991 and 1996.

Since the 1996–97 season, European Sports Media have awarded the Golden Shoe based on a points system that allows players in tougher leagues to win even if they score fewer goals than a player in a weaker league. The weightings are determined by the league's ranking on the UEFA coefficients, which in turn depend on the results of each league's clubs in European competition over the previous five seasons. Goals scored in the top five leagues according to the UEFA coefficients list are multiplied by a factor of two, goals scored in the leagues ranked 6 to 22 (previously 9 to 21) are multiplied by a factor of 1.5, and goals scored in leagues ranked 22 and below are multiplied by a factor of 1. Thus, goals scored in higher ranked leagues will count for more than those scored in weaker leagues. Since this change, there have only been two winners who were not playing in one of the top five leagues (Henrik Larsson, 2000–01 Scottish Premier League and Mario Jardel, 1998–99 Primeira Divisão and 2001–02 Primeira Liga).

Although the Golden Shoe could be shared among multiple players in the past, in the 2019–20 season this rule was changed to give the award to the player with the least minutes played, should there be a tie on points. If tie persists, number of league assists and, then, the less penalties scored, would be counted. If the tie ultimately persists, the award would be shared.

Winners

Notes

Statistics

Multiple winners 
Lionel Messi is the only player to win the award six times, all with Barcelona. He also holds the all-time record for goals in a single season with 50 in 2011–12, which accumulated to a record 100 points. Bayern Munich's Gerd Müller was the first player to win the award twice, in 1969–70 and 1971–72. Messi was the first player to win the award three times, and Messi again was the first and so far only player to win it five and six times. Only Messi (2016–17, 2017–18 and 2018–19) has won the award in three consecutive seasons. Thierry Henry (2003–04 and 2004–05), Messi (2011–12 and 2012–13; 2016–17, 2017–18 and 2018–19), Cristiano Ronaldo (2013–14 and 2014–15), Robert Lewandowski (2020–21 and 2021–22) and Ally McCoist (1991–92 and 1992–93) have won the award in consecutive seasons. Diego Forlán (Villarreal and Atlético Madrid), Luis Suárez (Liverpool and Barcelona), Mário Jardel (Porto and Sporting CP) and Ronaldo (Manchester United and Real Madrid) are the only players to have won the award with multiple clubs. Ronaldo and Suárez are the only players to win the award in two different leagues, with each having won the award while playing in both the Premier League and La Liga.

Winners by club

Winners by nationality

Winners by league

2022–23 season standings

Notes

References

External links

Official website - European Golden Shoe
List of winners since 1980–81
ESM Golden Shoe at WorldSoccer.com

European football trophies and awards
Awards established in 1967
Europe